Nate Brooks (born September 5, 1996) is an American football cornerback for the Birmingham Stallions of the United States Football League (USFL). He played college football at North Texas and signed with the Arizona Cardinals as an undrafted free agent in 2019.

Professional career

Arizona Cardinals
Following the conclusion of the 2019 NFL Draft, Brooks signed with the Arizona Cardinals as an undrafted free agent in 2019.

New England Patriots
On September 10, 2019, Brooks was signed to the New England Patriots practice squad.

Miami Dolphins
On December 10, 2019, Brooks signed by the Miami Dolphins from the New England Patriots practice squad.

On September 5, 2020, Brooks was waived/injured during final roster cuts, and subsequently reverted to the team's injured reserve list the next day. He was waived with an injury settlement on September 11.

Baltimore Ravens
On November 10, 2020, Brooks was signed to the Baltimore Ravens' practice squad. He was elevated to the active roster on January 2, 2021, for the team's week 17 game against the Cincinnati Bengals, and reverted to the practice squad after the game. He was released on January 4.

Tampa Bay Buccaneers
On May 6, 2021, Brooks was signed by the Tampa Bay Buccaneers. He was waived on August 22, 2021.

Tennessee Titans
On August 26, 2021, Brooks signed with the Tennessee Titans. He was waived on August 29, 2021. On November 1, 2021, Brooks was re-signed to the Titans practice squad. He was released on November 9, but later re-signed on December 15. He was released on December 27.

Arizona Cardinals (second stint)
On December 29, 2021, Brooks was signed to the Arizona Cardinals practice squad. He signed a reserve/future contract with the Cardinals on January 19, 2022. He was released on August 9, 2022.

Las Vegas Raiders
On August 12, 2022, Brooks was signed by the Las Vegas Raiders. He was waived on August 16, 2022.

Tennessee Titans (second stint)
On September 13, 2022, Brooks signed with the practice squad of the Tennessee Titans. He was released off the practice squad on October 18, 2022.

Birmingham Stallions
Brooks signed with the Birmingham Stallions of the USFL on December 3, 2022.

References

External links
Miami Dolphins bio

1996 births
Living people
American football defensive backs
Arizona Cardinals players
Baltimore Ravens players
Birmingham Stallions (2022) players
Las Vegas Raiders players
Miami Dolphins players
New England Patriots players
People from Whitehouse, Texas
Players of American football from Texas
Tampa Bay Buccaneers players
Tennessee Titans players